The 1986 World's Strongest Man was the tenth edition of World's Strongest Man and was won by Jón Páll Sigmarsson from Iceland. It was his second title after finishing second the previous year. 1983 and 1985 champion Geoff Capes from the United Kingdom finished second and, Ab Wolders from the Netherlands finished third. The contest was held at Nice, France.

Final results

References

External links
 Official site

World's Strongest
World's Strongest Man
1986 in French sport